Anti-Brahminism is a term used in opposition to caste-based hierarchical social order which places Brahmins at its highest position. Initial expressions of Anti-Brahminism emerged from instances of pre-colonial opposition to the caste system in India, ideological influences during the colonial period, viewed "Brahminism" as a corrupted religion imposed on the Indian population. Reformist Hindus, and also Ambedkar, structured their criticism along similar lines following the 19th century criticism of "Brahminism," opposing the dominant position Brahmins had acquired by the time of British rule in the 19th century.

Definitions
"Brahminism" refers both to the historical Brahmanical tradition and ideology of the late Vedic period (ca.1100-500 BCE), as to

"Anti-Brahminism" or "Non-Brahminism" is a movement in opposition to caste based discrimination and hierarchical social order which places Brahmins at its highest position. B. R. Ambedkar stated:

History

Pre-Colonial times
According to Novetzke, initial expressions of Anti-Brahminism emerged from instances of pre-colonial opposition to the caste system, ideological influences during the colonial period.

19th century colonialism 

According to Gelders and Delders, the structure of present-day anti-Brahminism has its roots in 19th century India and colonial views on the position and influence of Brahmins. 19th century colonial rulers viewed India's culture as corrupt and degenerate, and its population irrational. In this view, derived from a Protestant Christian understanding of religion, rooted in the Protestant opposition against the Catholic Church, the original "God-given religion" was corrupted by (Catholic) priests, which was extended by comparison to the Brahmins in India, and the Brahmin-dominated type of Hinduism, for which the term "Brahminism" was used, was supposedly imposed on the Indian population.

20th century
In the late 19th and early 20th century, with the rise of nationalist and rationalist movements, criticism against Brahminism came from both Brahmins and from low-caste Hindu communities. Reformist Hindus, but also Ambedkar, structured their criticism along similar lines following the 19th century criticism of "Brahminism."

According to Beteille, in Tamil Nadu the traditional position of Brahmins had been enforced with the beginning of British rule, profiting from western education and turning to an urban lifestyle. They monopolized the new urban jobs and entered the Indian Civil Service, gaining strongholds in government and bureaucracy, and also dominated the Congress Party. This widened the gap between Brahmins and non-Brahmins, but opposition quickly mounted. Anti-Brahminism became organized with the formation of the Justice Party in late 1916 in Tamil Nadu. This party was composed of non-Brahmins (who were typically part of either the feudal castes, land-owning agricultural castes, or merchant castes) and was committed to enhancing the opportunities for non-Brahmins. With the dawn of the 20th century, and the rapid penetration of western education and western ideas, there was a rise in consciousness amongst the lower castes who felt that rights which were legitimately theirs were being denied to them. In 1920, when the Justice Party came to power, Brahmins occupied about 70 percent of the high level posts in the government. After reservation was introduced by the Justice Party, it reversed this trend, allowing non-Brahmins to rise in the government of the Madras Presidency. In the 1930s, anti-Brahmanism was disseminated among the masses by the Self-Respect Movement.

One of the most prominent proponents of Anti-Brahminism was Dalit leader B. R. Ambedkar. Another prominent proponent was Dravidian leader Periyar E. V. Ramasamy. Periyar called on both Brahmins and non-Brahmins to shun Brahminism.

See also 
 Caste-related violence in India
 Reserved political positions in India
 Caste politics
 Reservations in India

References

Sources

Printed sources

 

  

 

 

 

 

 

Web sources

Further reading
 Politics and Social Conflict in South India, the Non-Brahman Movement and Tamil Separatism, 1916–1929. Berkeley: University of California Press, 1969. By Prof. Eugene Irschik

External links 
 Pune’s endless identity wars by Rakshit Sonawane, The Indian Express, January 6, 2011.
 Editorial by Francois Gautier on anti-Brahmanism

 
Politics of India